Louis Sulzbacher (May 10, 1842 – January 17, 1915) was the first continental American appointed as Associate Justice of the newly created Supreme Court of Puerto Rico in 1900.  Appointed by President William McKinley he assumed his post in August 1900 and served until 1904.

Born in Kirchheimbolanden, Bavaria, he was admitted to the Bar, according to his wife, in 1870.  He was fluent in five languages:  English, German, Spanish, French and Latin.  After retiring from the Court, he served from 1904 to 1907 as District Judge for the Western District of the Indian Territory.

He died in New York on January 17, 1915. After his death he was honored by the Supreme Court of Puerto Rico in a Memorial Resolution on January 29, 1915.

References 

La Justicia en sus Manos by Luis Rafael Rivera, 2007, 

Associate Justices of the Supreme Court of Puerto Rico
American judges
1842 births
1915 deaths
People from Kirchheimbolanden
People from the Palatinate (region)
19th-century American judges